Laurie King (27 July 1908 – 1992) was an Australian rules footballer who played with Sturt in the South Australian National Football League (SANFL).

References

External links 		
Laurie King's profile at AustralianFootball.com

		
		
		

1908 births
1992 deaths
Sturt Football Club players
Australian rules footballers from South Australia